The 1991 Vuelta a España was the 46th edition of the Vuelta a España, one of cycling's Grand Tours. The Vuelta began in Mérida, with an individual time trial on 29 April. Stage 11 was cancelled on 9 May, after snowfall, and stage 12 took place on 10 May with a stage from Bossòst. The race finished in Madrid on 19 May.

Stage 11
9 May 1991 — Andorra la Vella to Pla-de-Beret

This stage was planned to be  in length, passing over the Port del Cantó, the Port de la Bonaigua and finishing atop the Pla de Beret. The stage was cancelled due to heavy snowfall.

Stage 12
10 May 1991 — Bossòst to Cerler,

Stage 13
11 May 1991 — Benasque to Zaragoza,

Stage 14
12 May 1991 — Ezcaray to Valdezcaray,  (ITT)

Stage 15
13 May 1991 — Santo Domingo de la Calzada to Santander,

Stage 16
14 May 1991 — Santander to Lagos de Covadonga,

Stage 17
15 May 1991 — Cangas de Onís to Alto del Naranco,

Stage 18
16 May 1991 — León to Valladolid,

Stage 19
17 May 1991 — Valladolid to Valladolid,  (ITT)

Stage 20
18 May 1991 — Palazuelos de Eresma to Palazuelos de Eresma,

Stage 21
19 May 1991 — Collado Villalba to Madrid,

References

1991 Vuelta a España
Vuelta a España stages